Tachytes crassus is a species of square-headed wasp in the family Crabronidae. It is found in North America.

References

Crabronidae
Articles created by Qbugbot
Insects described in 1880